Hester is a given name and a surname.

Hester may also refer to:

Hester Avenue, a road in Perth, Western Australia
Hester, Western Australia, a small town in the south west of the state
Hester Site, an archaeological site in Monroe County, Mississippi
Hesters Store, North Carolina, an unincorporated community
Hester Street (Manhattan)
Hesters Way, an area in Cheltenham, Gloucestershire, England
Typhoon Hester, 1971 typhoon
Hester (novel), an 1883 novel by Margaret Oliphant

See also
Hester v. United States, a 1924 Supreme Court decision